Rassvet is a rural locality (a selo) and the administrative center of Ullubiyevsky Selsoviet, Tarumovsky District, Republic of Dagestan, Russia. The population was 1,216 as of 2010. There are 4 streets.

Geography 
Rassvet is located 22 km southeast of Tarumovka (the district's administrative centre) by road. Komsomolsky is the nearest rural locality.

References 

Rural localities in Tarumovsky District